This is a list of high schools in Greater St. Louis. It includes public and private schools and is arranged by state, county and then by school district for public schools, or by affiliation for private schools.

Illinois public schools

Bond County
Greenville High School, Greenville
Mulberry Grove High School, Mulberry Grove

Calhoun County
Brussels High School, Brussels
Calhoun High School, Hardin

Clinton County

Carlyle High School, Carlyle
Central Community High School, Breese
Christ Our Rock Lutheran High School, Centralia
Mater Dei High School, Breese
Wesclin Senior High School, Trenton

Jersey County
Jersey Community High School, Jerseyville

Macoupin County

Bunker Hill High School, Bunker Hill
Carlinville High School, Carlinville
Gillespie High School, Gillespie
Mount Olive High School, Mount Olive
North Mac High School, Virden
Northwestern High School, Palmyra
Southwestern High School, Piasa
Staunton High School, Staunton

Madison County

Alton Senior High School, Alton
Civic Memorial High School, Bethalto
Collinsville High School, Collinsville
East Alton-Wood River High School, Wood River
Edwardsville High School, Edwardsville
Father McGivney Catholic High School, Maryville
Granite City High School, Granite City
Highland High School, Highland
Madison Senior High School, Madison
Marquette Catholic High School, Alton
Metro-East Lutheran High School, Edwardsville
Roxana High School, Roxana
Triad High School, Troy

Monroe County

Columbia High School, Columbia
Gibault Catholic High School, Waterloo
Valmeyer High School, Valmeyer
Waterloo High School, Waterloo

St. Clair County

Althoff Catholic High School, Belleville
Belleville High School-East, Belleville
Belleville High School-West, Belleville
Berean Christian School, Fairview Heights
Cahokia High School, Cahokia Heights
Collinsville High School, Collinsville
Dupo High School, Dupo
East St. Louis Senior High School, East St. Louis
Freeburg Community High School, Freeburg
Lebanon High School, Lebanon
Marissa Jr/Sr High School, Marissa
Mascoutah Community High School, Mascoutah
New Athens High School, New Athens
O'Fallon Township High School, O'Fallon
SIUE East St. Louis Charter High School, East St. Louis

Missouri public schools

Franklin County

New Haven School District
New Haven High School

Meramec Valley School District
Pacific High School

St. Clair School District
St. Clair High School

Sullivan School District
Sullivan High School

Union School District
Union High School

Washington School District
Washington High School

Jefferson County

Crystal City School District
Crystal City High School

De Soto School District
De Soto Senior High School

Festus School District
Festus High School

Fox School District
Fox High School
Seckman High School

Herculaneum School District
Herculaneum High School

Hillsboro School District
Hillsboro High School

Jefferson R-7 School District
Jefferson R-VII High School

Northwest School District
Northwest High School

Lincoln County

Elsberry School District
Elsberry High School

Lincoln County R-III School District
Troy Buchanan High School

Silex School District
Silex High School

Winfield School District
Winfield High School

St. Charles County

Fort Zumwalt School District
Fort Zumwalt East High School
Fort Zumwalt North High School
Fort Zumwalt South High School
Fort Zumwalt West High School

Francis Howell School District
Francis Howell High School
Francis Howell Central High School
Francis Howell North High School
Francis Howell Union High School

Orchard Farm School District
Orchard Farm High School

St. Charles School District
St. Charles High School
St. Charles West High School

Wentzville School District
Wentzville Holt High School
Wentzville Liberty High School
Timberland High School

St. Louis County

Affton School District
Affton High School

Bayless School District
Bayless Senior High School

Brentwood School District
Brentwood High School

Clayton School District
Clayton High School

Ferguson-Florissant School District
McCluer High School
McCluer North High School
STEAM Academy at McCluer South-Berkeley

Hancock Place School District
Hancock Senior High School

Hazelwood School District
Hazelwood Central High School
Hazelwood East High School
Hazelwood West High School

Jennings School District
Jennings High School

Kirkwood School District
Kirkwood High School

Ladue School District
Ladue Horton Watkins High School

Lindbergh School District
Lindbergh High School

Maplewood Richmond Heights School District
Maplewood Richmond Heights High School

Mehlville School District
Mehlville High School
Oakville High School

Normandy School District
Normandy High School

Parkway School District
Fern Ridge High School
Parkway Central High School
Parkway North High School
Parkway South High School
Parkway West High School

Pattonville School District
Pattonville High School

Ritenour School District
Ritenour High School

Riverview Gardens School District
Riverview Gardens Senior High School

Rockwood School District
Eureka High School
Lafayette High School
Marquette High School
Rockwood Summit High School

University City School District
University City High School

Valley Park School District
Valley Park High School

Webster Groves School District
Webster Groves High School

St. Louis

Charter schools
Confluence Academy
Gateway Science Academy
Lift For Life Academy
St. Louis Language Immersion School: The Spanish School
 KIPP: St Louis

St. Louis Public Schools

Comprehensive schools
Beaumont High School (closed in 2014)
Carnahan High School of the Future
Northwest Transportation & Law
Roosevelt High School
Sumner High School
Vashon High School

Magnet schools
Central Visual and Performing Arts High School
Cleveland Junior Naval Academy
Clyde C. Miller Career Academy
Collegiate School of Medicine and Bioscience
Gateway STEM High School
Metro Academic and Classical High School
McKinley Classical Leadership Academy
Soldan International Studies High School

Warren County

Warren County School District
Warrenton High School

Wright City School District
Wright City High School

Washington County

Kingston School District
Kingston High School

Potosi School District
Potosi High School

Valley School District
Valley High School

Private schools

Baptist
Cornerstone Baptist Academy
Meramec Valley Christian School
Tower Grove Christian Academy
Twin City Christian Academy

Catholic

Archdiocese of St. Louis
Bishop DuBourg High School
Cardinal Ritter College Prep High School
Duchesne High School
John F. Kennedy High School (Closed in May 2017)
Rosati-Kain High School
St. Dominic High School
St. Francis Borgia Regional High School
St. Mary's High School
St. Pius X High School
Trinity Catholic High School (Closed in May 2021)

Diocese of Belleville
Althoff Catholic High School
Gibault Catholic High School
Mater Dei High School

Diocese of Springfield (Illinois)
Father McGivney Catholic High School
Marquette Catholic High School

Private
Barat Academy
Providence Classical Christian Academy
Chaminade College Preparatory School
Christian Brothers College High School
Cor Jesu Academy
De Smet Jesuit High School
Incarnate Word Academy
Nerinx Hall High School
Notre Dame High School
St. Elizabeth Academy (closed May 2013).
St. John Vianney High School
St. Joseph's Academy
Saint Louis Priory School
Saint Louis University High School
Ursuline Academy
Villa Duchesne
Visitation Academy of St. Louis

Christian Scientist
The Principia

Lutheran
Christ Our Rock Lutheran High School
Lutheran High School North
Lutheran High School South
Lutheran High School St. Charles
Metro East Lutheran High School (Edwardsville, Illinois)

Methodist
Troy Holiness School

Non-denominational
Christian High School
Crosspoint Christian School
North County Christian School
Westminster Christian Academy

Non-sectarian
Crossroads College Preparatory School
The Fulton School at St. Albans
John Burroughs School
Logos High School
Mary Institute and St. Louis Country Day School
Thomas Jefferson School
Whitfield School

Pentecostal
Apostolic Learning Academy (Dupo, Illinois)

See also
Education in Greater St. Louis
Education in St. Louis
List of high schools in Illinois
List of high schools in Missouri
List of school districts in Illinois
List of school districts in Missouri

References 

Education in Greater St. Louis

St. Louis-related lists
Greater St. Louis
St. Louis